Zinc finger protein PLAGL1 is a protein that in humans is encoded by the PLAGL1 gene.

Function 

This gene encodes a C2H2 zinc finger protein with transactivation and DNA-binding activity. This gene has been shown to exhibit antiproliferative activities and is a tumor suppressor gene candidate. Many transcript variants encoding two different isoforms have been found for this gene.

Interactions 

PLAGL1 has been shown to interact with P53.

References

Further reading